Athina Tzavella (born 9 January 1988) is a Greek former swimmer, who specialized in breaststroke and individual medley events. Tzavella won a bronze medal in the 200 m individual medley at the 2003 European Junior Swimming Championships in Glasgow, Scotland with a time of 2:16.35, 0.11 of a second behind her teammate Vasiliki Angelopoulou. Having reached a B-standard entry time by FINA, Tzavella earned a spot on the Greek team for the Olympics.

Tzavella represented the host nation Greece, as a 16-year-old, at the 2004 Summer Olympics in Athens, competing in two swimming events. In the 200 m individual medley, Tzavella challenged seven other swimmers, including U.S. swimmer and three-time Olympian Amanda Beard on the third heat of the morning's preliminaries. She finished only in seventh place for her heat and twenty-third overall by less than 0.22 of a second behind Malaysia's Siow Yi Ting with a time of 2:20.30. In her second event, 200 m breaststroke, Tzavella recorded a slowest time of 2:40.18 on the same heat, finishing thirty-first overall in the preliminaries.

References

External links
2004 Olympic Profile – Eideisis Ellinika 

1988 births
Living people
Greek female swimmers
Olympic swimmers of Greece
Swimmers at the 2004 Summer Olympics
Greek female breaststroke swimmers
Greek female medley swimmers
Swimmers from Athens
20th-century Greek women
21st-century Greek women